Michał Bałasz (born January 22, 1924, in Wilno, Poland (now Vilnius, Lithuania)) is a Polish architect, specializing in sacred architecture, notably Orthodox and Roman Catholic churches.

Notable works
 The Orthodox Church of the Icon of Our Lady of Częstochowa in Częstochowa
 The Orthodox Church of St. Demetrius in Hajnówka
 The Roman Catholic Church of the Resurrection in Białystok
 The Orthodox Church of the Hagia Sophia in Białystok
 The Roman Catholic Church of Divine Providence in Bielsk Podlaski
 The Orthodox Church of St. Anne in Boratyniec Ruski

References

1924 births
Architects from Vilnius
Living people
Artists from Białystok